Israel Ori (1658–1711) was a prominent figure of the Armenian national liberation movement and a diplomat that sought the liberation of Armenia from Persia and the Ottoman Empire.

Early life
Ori was born in 1658 in the village of Sisian in Syunik. He was the son of Melik Haikazian of Syunik. During his youth along with a number of other Armenians, Ori looked for support among the European powers in the fight of Armenians against the Persian and Ottoman Empires. As one of the members of a seven-man delegation created by Catholicos Jacob IV and the support of Georgian King George XI he visited Constantinople in 1678. When the Catholicos died, the plan was abandoned, but Ori independently resolved to complete the mission and journeyed to Venice, Paris and Vienna. He joined the French army of Louis XIV, and entered into contact with the high political circles of France, in course of which he constantly raised the question about the liberation of Armenian people from the foreign yoke; however, he was met with cold indifference.

Life in Germany
In 1695 Ori settled in Germany, in the city of Düsseldorf, where he established connections with Johann Wilhelm, Elector Palatine. Hoping that the question of Armenia would become the object of consideration in the highest diplomatic circles of European states, German prince sent Ori with a letter of recommendation to the emperor of Austria and the ruler of Florence. However, since Ori did not have official authority from the Armenian political mainstream, his statements were disregarded. Ori departed to Armenia with the purpose to obtain the appropriate written documents from the Armenian nobility on the advice of Johann Wilhelm. In 1699 Ori, together with melik Safraz called in Angekhakot a secret conference along with eleven Syunik Meliks, where they agreed to officially ask for military aid from West European states. Ori met with Emperor Leopold I in 1700 who advised him that Russian support would be necessary for the success of his plan. Without having attained results in Germany and Austria, Ori in 1701 left for Moscow.

The Armenia Plan

Ori was the first to set the pro-Russian orientation of the Armenian liberation movement for decades to come. After arriving in Moscow, Ori met Peter the Great and presented the request from the Meliks of Syunik where they had written that we do not have another hope, we hope for God and your country. Peter responded favorably. He promised to render assistance to the Armenian people after the end of Russo-Swedish War. In the meantime Ori also met with Pope Clement XI in 1704 who offered him his support. Ori proposed to the Russian court a plan, which contained the following points: for liberating the Armenian and Georgian peoples it is necessary to send via the Caucasus a twenty-five thousand strong Russian army, fifteen thousand Cossack riders and ten thousand infantrymen.

Cavalry must move to Transcaucasia with the road, which passes on the Daryal gorge, and infantry should cross from Astrakhan on the Caspian Sea. Russian troops will meet the Armenian and Georgian armed forces. Thus, even in the beginning of the 18th century within the Russian court the question about the preparation for a march in Transcaucasia was raised. It was agreed that a special envoy should be sent to Persia headed by Ori, to study the situation, the will of the locals, gather information on the fortresses and roads of the country and so forth. In order not to excite suspicions, Ori would say that he was sent by the Pope of Rome, to the court of Shah Husayn for the purpose of gathering information on the well being of the Christians in Persia. In 1707, after the necessary preparations, Ori with the rank of the Colonel of Russian army and with the large formation solemnly went to Persia. The French missionaries in Persia attempted to prevent the arrival of Ori into Isfahan, trying to convince the Shah that Russia was intending to restore the political independence of Armenia, and that Ori intends to be the King of Armenia.

When Ori reached Shamakhi, he was forced to wait several days before being granted permission to enter Isfahan. In Shemakhi he met local Armenian and Georgian political figures, strengthening their sympathies towards Russia. In 1709 Ori arrived in Isfahan, where he again conducted negotiations with the local political figures. In 1711 Ori suddenly died in Astrakhan during the return to Russia from Persia.

All of Ori's efforts helped to inspire Joseph Emin (1726–1809), who went on to keep the idea of the liberation of Armenia alive.

References

 Yuri Babayan - An Outstanding Armenian patriot

1658 births
1711 deaths
People from Sisian
Persian Armenians
Armenian revolutionaries
Iranian emigrants to the Russian Empire
Armenian people from the Russian Empire
17th-century people of Safavid Iran
17th-century Armenian politicians
18th-century Armenian politicians
18th-century people of Safavid Iran